The 2020 NRL Grand Final was the conclusive and premiership-deciding game of the 2020 National Rugby League season held at Sydney's ANZ Stadium on October 25. The match was contested between minor premiers Penrith Panthers and second-placed Melbourne Storm. Melbourne led the game 22–0 at half time before holding off a late Penrith comeback to win 26–20, claiming their fourth premiership title. Melbourne fullback Ryan Papenhuyzen was awarded the Clive Churchill Medal as the official man of the match. The match was attended by 37,303 spectators due to an enforced limit to stadium capacity by the NSW government as a result of the COVID-19 pandemic in Australia. The game would be the last for Melbourne hooker and captain Cameron Smith after announcing his retirement in the following year, making him the most-capped player in the NRL with 430 games, and the most for a single club.

The match was preceded by the 2020 NRL Women's Premiership Grand Final, where the Brisbane Broncos defeated the Sydney Roosters 20–10 to win their third premiership title in succession, and their second Grand Final win against the Roosters after the teams met in the inaugural NRLW Grand Final in 2018.

Pre-match entertainment was headlined by Australian indie pop singer Amy Shark. The match was broadcast live throughout Australia by the Nine Network.

Background

It was the first time the Penrith Panthers and the Melbourne Storm met in an NRL Grand Final, and in a finals match in general. The Penrith side were awarded the minor premiership for the third time in the club's history, and were aiming to secure a third premiership; the Panthers having secured both titles in 1991 and 2003. It was Ivan Cleary's second Grand Final appearance as a coach, having led the New Zealand Warriors to a 10–24 loss against Manly-Warringah Sea Eagles in 2011. It was the Storm's fourth Grand Final appearance in five years, winning the 2017 premiership and runners-up in 2016 and 2018.

Penrith and Melbourne finished first and second respectively on the regular season ladder. The two sides previously met at Campbelltown Stadium in round 6, with the Penrith side defeating Melbourne 21–14. As a result of restrictions imposed by the Victorian Government in response to the COVID-19 pandemic in Australia, Melbourne were forced to play the remainder of the season outside their home state, with the club winning their home games at Kogarah Oval and Suncorp Stadium, before playing their remaining six home games at Sunshine Coast Stadium, which all resulted in wins. Both sides won their respective Qualifying Finals: the Penrith side narrowly defeated the reigning premiers Sydney Roosters 29–28 at Panthers Stadium, and the Storm beating Parramatta Eels 36–24 at Suncorp Stadium. In the subsequent Preliminary Finals, Melbourne would go on to defeat 2019 runners-up Canberra Raiders 30–10 at Suncorp Stadium, with the Penrith side defeating the South Sydney Rabbitohs 20–16 at ANZ Stadium.

Pre-match

Broadcasting
The match will be broadcast live on the Nine Network and delayed on Fox League in Australia and Sky Sport in New Zealand. Radio broadcasters include ABC, Triple M, 2GB, SEN and Koori Radio.

Entertainment

Officiating

Attendance

Curtain-raiser matches
Curtain-raiser matches on the day will include two matches

Teams

James Tamou, Apisai Koroisau, and Zane Tetevano were the only players in the Penrith line-up to have had previous NRL grand final experience after winning premiership titles for the North Queensland Cowboys in 2015, South Sydney Rabbitohs in 2014, and Sydney Roosters in 2018 respectively. Halfback Nathan Cleary played his 100th first-grade match. Ryan Papenhuyzen, Brenko Lee, Justin Olam, Jahrome Hughes, Tino Fa'asuamaleaui, and Nicho Hynes were the only Melbourne players to make their NRL grand final debut (although Hynes spent the entire match on the bench), while Cameron Smith, Suliasi Vunivalu, Cameron Munster, Jesse Bromwich, Kenny Bromwich, and Dale Finucane played in each of the Storm's last three grand final appearances. Only Cameron Smith and Jesse Bromwich have played in further grand finals for Melbourne.

Officials

Match summary

First half
The first score came when Melbourne's Justin Olam attempted to score in the fourth minute. The referee ruled “no try”, but a video review showed that Penrith’s Tyrone May had kicked the ball out and ordered a penalty try. Cameron Smith converted. In the seventh minute Josh Mansour appeared to have scored for the Penrith side, but it was disallowed for a Stephen Crichton obstruction. Penrith made errors twice and Smith took advantage with two penalty goals. Later Nathan Cleary misdirected a pass which Suliasi Vunivalu intercepted, running 80 meters for a length of field try. With a minute remaining, Smith scored his first grand final try, right in front of the goal posts. It was initially called “no try”, until replays showed Apisai Koroisau knocking it from his hands. Smith hit the conversion, the half finishing 22–0 in favour of the Melbourne club.

Second half

Five minutes into the second half, Ryan Papenhuyzen ran 70 metres to score from a scrum, this turned out to be Melbourne's last score for the night. When all looked lost for the Penrith side, Isaah Yeo kicked and Brian To'o scored in the corner in the 53rd minute. There was controversy over the legality of it, but the try stood. In the 67th minute Papenhuyzen leapt over the touchline to knock a Penrith penalty kick back into play. Two minutes later, Luai passed to Stephen Crichton, who scored, bringing the score to 12–26. In the 71st minute, Viliame Kikau ran into Jahrome Hughes in attempt to score a try. The referee ruled a professional foul and Hughes was removed from the field. Two minutes later, Jarome Luai threw a long ball to Josh Mansour who scored bringing the scores to 16–26 with seven minutes left. Nathan Cleary missed the conversion. With just over a minute left in the match Brandon Smith was sinbinned for a professional foul, reducing Melbourne's men to 11, Penrith took advantage and scored with a fast try to Cleary. With the clock ticking down and about 20 seconds remaining, Cleary declined the conversion, knowing that this move would give Penrith extra time to try to draw level on the last play, if he elected to kick the remaining time on the clock would have been eaten up, by the conversion attempt. Shortly after the kick-off, the siren sounded, and with the ball still live, Penrith players passed desperately, but it was eventually intercepted by Melbourne Storm's Felise Kaufusi, ending the game.

Ryan Papenhuyzen was judged best afield, winning his first Clive Churchill Medal. This is only the 2nd ever Grand Final in which 20 or more points were scored in both halves, the first being the 2001 NRL Grand Final. On both occasions the side which ultimately won had established a score of greater than 20 points to 0 in the first half and held on against a 20 or more points comeback by the opposition in the second half.

NRL Women's Premiership Grand Final

The 2020 NRL Women's Premiership Grand Final was the culmination of the 2020 NRL Women's season.

Notes

References

2020 NRL season
NRL Grand Finals
NRL
Melbourne Storm matches
Penrith Panthers matches
NRL Grand Final